This article presents statistics covering the COVID-19 pandemic in Thailand.

Maps

Graphs

Overview

New confirmed cases per day in Thailand

New confirmed deaths per day in Thailand

References

Statistics
Thailand